Kos Gina Mistake is a Maldivian romantic comedy film written and directed by Yoosuf Shafeeu. Co-produced by VMedia and Ismail Shafeeq, the film stars Shafeeu, Ali Seezan, Nuzuhath Shuaib, Ali Azim and Mariyam Azza in pivotal roles.

Cast 
 Yoosuf Shafeeu as Amsadh
 Ali Seezan as Arumin
 Nuzuhath Shuaib as Shaina
 Ali Azim as Fazeen
 Mariyam Azza as Shaima
 Irufana Ibrahim as Raaniya
 Ahmed Saeed as Love "Luv"
 Ahmed Nimal as Hashim
 Ahmed Easa as Fazeel
 Hamid Ali as Hamza
 Gulisthan Mohamed as Raudha
 Mohamed Navaal as Najih
 Abdullah Shafiu Ibrahim as Fathih

Development
After the success of VMedia's first feature film Dhauvath (2019), the company, on 12 August 2020, announced their next venture titled Kos Gina Mistake which features an ensemble cast including Yoosuf Shafeeu, Ali Seezan, Nuzuhath Shuaib, Ali Azim, Mariyam Azza and Ahmed Easa. Shooting for the film was commenced on 25 August 2019 in ADh. Fenfushi. The team flew back to Male' on 30 September 2019, upon completion of the scheduled shoot at Fenfushi. On 9 January 2020, Ismail Shafeeq was reported to join the crew of the film to co-produce the film. Filming of the six scenes left incomplete during the initial schedule was completed in March 2020.

Release
In the event of film announcement, director Yoosuf Shafeeu indicated that the film was scheduled to release in November 2019. However, citing the delay in completion of filming and considering the "unfavourable" nature of releasing the film during the year end, the team announced that the film will release in 2020. Planned to release in July or August 2020, the team later postponed the premiere of the film indefinitely due to COVID-19 pandemic.

Soundtrack

References

Maldivian romantic comedy films
Upcoming films
Films directed by Yoosuf Shafeeu
Dhivehi-language films